WKZW (94.3 FM, "KZ-94.3") is a radio station licensed to serve the community of Sandersville, Mississippi, and serving the Laurel-Hattiesburg area.  The station is owned by Blakeney Communications, Inc. It airs a hot adult contemporary music format.

WKZW began operation July 7, 1975 as the FM sister station to WIZK. The station was assigned the WKZW call letters by the Federal Communications Commission on April 8, 1998 (which were formerly assigned to the Peoria, Illinois legendary KZ-93 and later, KZ-94.3 in the same market).

The station airs the Murphy, Sam, and Jodi morning show and is the flagship station for Southern Miss Golden Eagles baseball.

References

External links
WKZW official website

KZW
Hot adult contemporary radio stations in the United States
Jones County, Mississippi